
 
Basford railway station was a station on the Grand Junction Railway serving the villages of Basford, Hough and Weston in what was then Cheshire, England.

History
Most of the stations on the line opened at the same time but Basford was a late addition, opening sometime before 8 August 1838 when it was first mentioned in Company minutes. The station does not feature in the company's first (1837) timetable. Whishaw (1842) calls the station Basford Heath.

The Osborne's guide (2nd edition, published in 1838) says "This station has been lately added, for the convenience of the neighbouring country: and there is a large house erected close by, which is intended for an inn. The road to the right leads to the Potteries, that to the left for Nantwich". Webster (1972) also notes that the station was "added almost as an afterthought when it was seen that there was sufficient demand from the neighbouring countryside". The precise location of the station is provided by Mogg (1840) who also notes that "its continuance is doubtful and on that account not worthy of notice", and Cruchley's 1856 Railway & Telegraph Map of Cheshire shows it located where the turnpike from Newcastle-under-Lyme to Nantwich crosses the railway.

In 1838 the station saw two north-bound trains at 0853 and 1857, the trains going on to both Liverpool and Manchester, and two in the opposite direction at 0857 and 1857 going to Birmingham.

The service level stayed much the same with two or three daily services in each direction stopping at the station (ecept on Sundays), the times changed occasionally, by 1855 the up services were at 1025 and 1934 and the down services at 0820, 1647 and 1901.

Notes

References

Bibliography

Further reading

 

Disused railway stations in Cheshire
Former London and North Western Railway stations
Railway stations in Great Britain opened in 1837
Railway stations in Great Britain closed in 1875